Goaway and Twobriefcases is a 1974 Soviet comedy film directed by Eduard Gavrilov.

Plot 
The film tells about two schoolchildren, whom classmates call Twobriefcases because of their small stature, and a puppy named Goaway, who needs protection and education.

Cast 
 Andrei Kondratyev as Alyosha Seroglazov
 Ekaterina Kuznetsova as Snezhana Sokolova
 Leonid Kuravlyov as Dmitriy Eduardovich
 Larisa Luzhina as Irina Dmitriyevna
 Vladimir Zamanskiy as Pal Palych (as V. Zamanskiy)
 Lyudmila Gladunko as Veta Pavlovna (as L. Gladunko)
 Aleksei Yegorin as Misha Lvov (as Alyosha Yegorin)
 Arkadi Markin as Yura Gusev
 Nastya Nitochkina as Nastya Akulova
 Lena Kozhakina as Olya Blinova

References

External links 
 

1974 films
1970s Russian-language films
Soviet comedy films
1974 comedy films